Yang Sang-guk (born October 1, 1983), is a South Korean comedian.

References

External links

1983 births
Living people
South Korean male comedians
People from Gimhae
Gag Concert
Society Game contestants
South Korean Buddhists